The Pasayten River is a tributary of the Similkameen River, in the Canadian province of British Columbia and the U.S. state of Washington.
The Pasayten River is part of the Columbia River drainage basin, being a tributary of the Similkameen River, which flows into the Okanagan River, which flows into the Columbia River.

Course
The Pasayten River originates in the North Cascades part of the Cascade Range. It flows generally north through the Pasayten Wilderness and across the international boundary.

West Fork 

The West Fork Pasayten River originates on the north slopes of Slate Peak and flows north until it reaches Three Forks, where it and the Middle Fork converge to form the Pasayten River Proper.  Rock Creek also joins here, which makes the name "Three Forks" very appealing to not only the three way confluence, but to the nearby cabin.

Middle Fork 

The Middle Fork Pasayten River originates in Slate Pass and flows north until it reaches Three Forks, where it and the West Fork converge to form the Pasayten River Proper.

East Fork 

The East Fork Pasayten River originates at Dollar Watch Pass and flows west, picking up the outlet stream from Big Hidden Lake just over halfway to its eventual meeting with the mainstream of the Pasayten just upstream from the Canada/United States border.

Mainstream 

The Pasayten River Proper begins at Three Forks, where the West and Middle Forks converge to form the mainstream.  The Pasayten, prior to crossing the border, is joined by the East Fork.  The river, after crossing the border, continues to flow north.  The Pasayten River flows just east of E. C. Manning Provincial Park before joining the Similkameen River near East Gate along the Hope-Princeton Highway.

Tributaries

Tributaries in the US

West Fork
Oregon Creek
Shaw Creek
Holman Creek
Threemile Creek
Kid Creek
Middle Fork
Silver Creek
Shack Creek
Point Creke
Berk Creek

East Fork
Mayo Creek
Quartz Creek
Snowslide Creek
White Creek
Getaway Creek
Farewell Creek
Judy Creek

Mainstream
Rock Creek
Lease Creek
Lodgepole Creek
Soda Creek
Thomson Creek
Holdover Creek
Central Creek
Harrison Creek
Trail Creek
Bunker Hill Creek

Tributaries in Canada
Peeve Creek
Calcite Creek

See also
List of rivers of Washington
List of British Columbia rivers
Tributaries of the Columbia River

References

Rivers of Okanogan County, Washington
Rivers of British Columbia
Rivers of Washington (state)
International rivers of North America
Similkameen Country